Daniel "Danny" Kepley (born August 24, 1953) is a former star linebacker for the Edmonton Eskimos of the Canadian Football League.

Kepley played college football at East Carolina University. He tried out with the NFL's Dallas Cowboys before starting a 10-year career with the Eskimos from 1975 to 1984.

He was an intense player and hard tackler. Teamed with fellow linebackers Dale Potter and Tom Towns for 8 seasons, this trio formed the backbone of a defence that played in 7 Grey Cup games, winning six championships. Kepley won 3 CFL's Most Outstanding Defensive Player Awards and was an All Star 5 times.

Following retirement, Kepley spent the 1985 season as an assistant coach with the Eskimos. He began a real estate career, worked as a football analyst on both radio (CFRN) and television (CBC, ESPN), and from 2002 to 2010 was an assistant coach with the Eskimos. Kepley has struggled with alcoholism and in 2000 spent time in jail for impaired driving, his fifth such offence.

Kepley was inducted into the Canadian Football Hall of Fame in 1996, and in 2006 was named one of the CFL's Top 50 players (#11) of the league's modern era by Canadian sports network The Sports Network/TSN.

References 

1953 births
Living people
American players of Canadian football
Canadian Football Hall of Fame inductees
Canadian Football League announcers
Canadian football linebackers
Canadian Football League Most Outstanding Defensive Player Award winners
East Carolina Pirates football players
Edmonton Elks coaches
Edmonton Elks players
People from Albemarle, North Carolina
Players of American football from North Carolina